Billbergia stenopetala is a species of flowering plant in the genus Billbergia. This species is native to Ecuador and Peru.

Cultivars
 Billbergia 'Hirtz'
 Billbergia 'Sangre'

References

stenopetala
Flora of Ecuador
Flora of Peru
Plants described in 1927